Jennine Capó Crucet is a Cuban-American novelist, and short story writer.

Life 
Capó Crucet attended Cornell University where she received a B.A. in English and Feminist, Gender and Sexuality Studies.  She also graduated from the University of Minnesota with an M.F.A. in Creative Writing. She is currently an Associate Professor of English and Ethnic Studies at the University of Nebraska.

Her work has appeared in The New York Times.

Capó Crucet is best known for her short story collection How to Leave Hialeah which focuses on her experiences as a Cuban-American woman growing up in a working-class neighborhood of Miami.
For this collection she won the John Gardner Book Award. Her second book, Make Your Home Among Strangers, was released in 2015. This book became the subject of controversy when students at Georgia Southern University burned a copy on a grill after a question and answer session by Crucet.
The book burned at Georgia Southern University was My Time Among The Whites.

Awards
O. Henry Award
Iowa Short Fiction Prize
John Gardner Book Award

Publications
How to Leave Hialeah - (short story collection) University of Iowa Press, 2009. 
Make Your Home Among Strangers - (novel) St. Martin's Press, 2015. 
My Time Among the Whites: Notes from an Unfinished Education - Picador, 2019.

References

External links 

Living people
University of Nebraska–Lincoln faculty
American women short story writers
Year of birth missing (living people)
American women novelists
21st-century American short story writers
21st-century American novelists
21st-century American women writers
American writers of Cuban descent
Cornell University alumni
American women academics